Patricia Holmes (17 March 1915–1992) was an Australian cricket player. Holmes played three test matches for the Australia national women's cricket team.

References

1915 births
1992 deaths
Australia women Test cricketers